The 2021–22 season was Crystal Palace's ninth consecutive season in the Premier League (extending their longest ever spell in the top division of English football) and the 116th year in their history. This season, Palace participated in the Premier League, FA Cup and EFL Cup. The season covers the period from 1 July 2021 to 30 June 2022.

Squad

Managerial changes
On 4 July, Patrick Vieira was appointed as Palace's new manager on a three-year deal, replacing Roy Hodgson.

Pre-season friendlies
Palace announced they would have a friendly matches against Portsmouth, Walsall, Ipswich Town, Charlton Athletic, Reading and Watford as part of their pre-season preparations.

Competitions

Premier League

League table

Results summary

Results by matchday

Matches
The league fixtures were announced on 16 June 2021.

FA Cup

Palace were drawn away to Millwall in the third round.

EFL Cup

Palace entered the competition in the second round and were drawn away to Watford.

Transfers

Transfers in

Loans in

Loans out

Transfers out

Notes

Statistics

Appearances

Goalscorers 
The list is sorted by shirt number when total goals are equal.

Clean sheets
The list is sorted by shirt number when total clean sheets are equal.

See also
 2021–22 in English football
 List of Crystal Palace F.C. seasons

References

Crystal Palace
Crystal Palace F.C. seasons
Crystal Palace
Crystal Palace